Moritz Werner Fenchel (3 May 1905 – 24 January 1988) was a mathematician known for his contributions to geometry and to optimization theory.  Fenchel established the basic results of convex analysis and nonlinear optimization theory which would, in time, serve as the foundation for nonlinear programming.  A German-born Jew and early refugee from Nazi suppression of intellectuals, Fenchel lived most of his life in Denmark.  Fenchel's monographs and lecture notes are considered influential.

Biography

Early life and education
Fenchel was born on 3 May 1905 in Berlin, Germany, his younger brother was the Israeli film director and architect Heinz Fenchel.

Fenchel studied mathematics and physics at the University of Berlin between 1923 and 1928.  He wrote his doctorate thesis in geometry (Über Krümmung und Windung geschlossener Raumkurven) under Ludwig Bieberbach.

Professorship in Germany
From 1928 to 1933, Fenchel was Professor E. Landau's Assistant at the University of Göttingen.  During a one-year leave (on Rockefeller Fellowship) between 1930 and 1931, Fenchel spent time in Rome with Levi-Civita, as well as in Copenhagen with Harald Bohr and Tommy Bonnesen.
He visited Denmark again in 1932.

Professorship in exile
Fenchel taught at Göttingen until 1933, when the Nazi discrimination laws led to mass-firings of Jews.

Fenchel emigrated to Denmark somewhere between April and September 1933, ultimately obtaining a position at the University of Copenhagen.  In December 1933, Fenchel married fellow German refugee mathematician Käte Sperling.

When Germany occupied Denmark, Fenchel and roughly eight-thousand other Danish Jews received refuge in Sweden, where he taught (between 1943 and 1945) at the Danish School in Lund. After the Allied powers' liberation of Denmark, Fenchel returned to Copenhagen.

Professorship postwar
In 1946, Fenchel was elected a member of the Royal Danish Academy of Sciences and Letters.

On leave between 1949 and 1951, Fenchel taught in the U.S. at the University of Southern California, Stanford University, and Princeton University.

From 1952 to 1956 Fenchel was the professor in mechanics at the Polytechnic in Copenhagen.

From 1956 to 1974 he was the professor in mathematics at the University of Copenhagen.

Last years, death, legacy
Professor Fenchel died on 24 January 1988.

Geometric contributions

Convex geometry

Optimization theory

Fenchel lectured on "Convex Sets, Cones, and Functions" at Princeton University in the early 1950s. His lecture notes shaped the field of convex analysis, according to the monograph Convex Analysis of R. T. Rockafellar.

Hyperbolic geometry

Books

See also

Convex analysis
Convex cone
Convex function
Convex set
Legendre–Fenchel transformation
Convex minimization
Fenchel's duality theorem
Geometry
Convex geometry
Brunn–Minkowski theorem
Differential geometry
Fenchel's theorem
Hyperbolic geometry
Jakob Nielsen
Fenchel–Nielsen coordinates
Nonlinear programming

References

External links
 
 Werner Fenchel website – contains CV, biography, links to archive, etc.

Geometers
Differential geometers
20th-century German mathematicians
Danish mathematicians
Jewish emigrants from Nazi Germany to Denmark
1905 births
1988 deaths
Variational analysts